Deh Now (also known as Dehnow ‘Alām Rūdasht and Dehnow Allam Roodasht) is a village in Alamarvdasht Rural District, Alamarvdasht District, Lamerd County, Fars Province, Iran. At the 2006 census, its population was 980, in 200 families.

References 

Populated places in Lamerd County